The  is a branch of Toei Company's Metal Hero Series. It includes:
Space Sheriff Gavan, 44 episodes 1982-3
Space Sheriff Sharivan, 51 episodes 1983-4
Space Sheriff Shaider, 49 episodes 1984-5
The Space Sheriff Spirits in 2006
Kaizoku Sentai Gokaiger vs. Space Sheriff Gavan: The Movie in January 2012
Space Sheriff Gavan: The Movie in October 2012
Kamen Rider × Super Sentai × Space Sheriff: Super Hero Taisen Z in April 2013